Arthur Charles Mietzcke (28 June 1914 – 9 June 1972) was an Australian rules footballer who played for the South Melbourne Football Club in the Victorian Football League (VFL).

Mietzcke later served in the Australian Army during World War II.

Notes

External links 

Art Mietzcke's playing statistics from The VFA Project

1914 births
1972 deaths
Australian rules footballers from Victoria (Australia)
Sydney Swans players
Northcote Football Club players
Australian Army personnel of World War II
Military personnel from Victoria (Australia)